Alfredo Guzmán (born 6 February 1943) is a Mexican former swimmer who competed in the 1960 Summer Olympics and in the 1964 Summer Olympics.

References

1943 births
Living people
Mexican male swimmers
Swimmers from Mexico City
Mexican male freestyle swimmers
Olympic swimmers of Mexico
Swimmers at the 1959 Pan American Games
Swimmers at the 1960 Summer Olympics
Swimmers at the 1963 Pan American Games
Swimmers at the 1964 Summer Olympics
Pan American Games silver medalists for Mexico
Pan American Games medalists in swimming
Central American and Caribbean Games gold medalists for Mexico
Competitors at the 1962 Central American and Caribbean Games
Central American and Caribbean Games medalists in swimming
Medalists at the 1959 Pan American Games
20th-century Mexican people